Pterolophia javicola is a species of beetle in the family Cerambycidae. It was described by Warren Samuel Fisher in 1936.

References

javicola
Beetles described in 1936